Roger DeHoog (born 1965/1966) is an American lawyer and judge from Oregon who is a justice of the Oregon Supreme Court. He served as a judge of the Oregon Court of Appeals from 2016 to 2022.

Education 

DeHoog received his Bachelor of Arts from Dartmouth College and his Juris Doctor from the University of Oregon School of Law.

Legal career 

DeHoog served as a public defender in Deschutes County, Oregon, from 1993 to 2000. He was in private practice in Bend from 2000 to 2007. From 2007 to 2016, he served in the special litigation unit of the Oregon Department of Justice.

Judicial career 

From 2012 to 2015, DeHoog served as a judge of the Deschutes County Circuit Court. He was then appointed to the Oregon Court of Appeals in 2015.

Appointment to Oregon Supreme Court 

On January 19, 2022, governor Kate Brown appointed DeHoog to be a justice of the Oregon Supreme Court to fill the vacancy left by the retirement of Justice Lynn Nakamoto. He is the second Asian Pacific American to be appointed to the supreme court.

See also
List of Asian American jurists

References

External links 

1960s births
Living people
Place of birth missing (living people)
20th-century American lawyers
21st-century American judges
21st-century American lawyers
American jurists of Asian descent
Asian-American people in Oregon politics
Dartmouth College alumni
Justices of the Oregon Supreme Court
Oregon Court of Appeals judges
Oregon lawyers
Oregon state court judges
University of Oregon School of Law alumni
Public defenders